Bangalore Mail is a 1968 Indian Kannada-language film directed by L. S. Narayana and produced by Y. V. Rao. The film stars Rajkumar, Narasimharaju and Jayanthi. The movie is a remake of the 1967 Malayalam movie Cochin Express, which was also subsequently remade in Telugu as  Circar Express, in Tamil as Neelagiri Express and in Hindi as The Train.

Malayalam actor Kottarakara Sreedharan Nair appeared in the role of a gangster in his only Kannada movie appearance. Director S. K. Bhagavan played the role of antagonist in the movie. This is one of the few movies where credits to Chi. Udayashankar appear first before crediting the lead roles of the movie. Rajkumar makes an entry after nearly half an hour into the movie.

Cast
 Rajkumar
 Narasimharaju as Babu Rajendra Prasad Venkata Girija Ramana
 Jayanthi
 Vijayasree
S.K.Bhagawan
 Kottarakkara Sreedharan Nair
 B. V. Radha
 Jyothi Lakshmi
 K. S. Ashwath as Mrutyunjaya Rao in a guest appearance
 Vijayarao
 Comedian Guggu

Soundtrack

The music of the film was composed by Satyam, with lyrics by Chi. Udaya Shankar. The album consists of six tracks.

References

External links
 

1968 films
1960s Kannada-language films
Films set on trains
1960s spy thriller films
Films scored by Satyam (composer)
Indian spy thriller films
Kannada remakes of Malayalam films
Indian thriller drama films
Indian mystery thriller films
1960s mystery thriller films
1960s thriller drama films
1960s mystery drama films
1968 drama films